The Fremont Point transmitting station is a facility for FM radio and television transmission at Fremont, Vingtaine du Nord, Saint John, Jersey.

It serves the whole of the Channel Islands, either directly or via the relay stations at Mont Orgueil, Alderney, Saint Brelade, Saint Helier, St Peter Port, Torteval and Les Touillets - the last of which is a high power relay which covers most of Guernsey. That transmitter was previously located at Lichfield in Staffordshire. It is owned by Arqiva. DAB radio on VHF Band III is now transmitted from this site.

History
The transmitter was constructed by the then Independent Television Authority to bring Independent Television to the Channel Islands in the form of the ITV franchise Channel Television. The BBC had already been transmitting their BBC Television Service (renamed BBC1 from April 1964) to the Channel Islands from the "Les Platons" transmitter site since October 1955. 

Channel Television commenced broadcasting from the transmitter on 1 September 1962. 

On 24 July 1976 the transmitter became the main transmitter site in the Channel Islands and commenced broadcasting in UHF 625 line for the first time, not only for Channel Television but also for BBC1 and BBC2 (BBC2 launched in the Channel Islands on the same day, with the Channel Islands being the last region to get BBC2).

Colour television also commenced for the first time on 24 July 1976 from the transmitter. The Channel Islands were the last region to get colour television due to the technical difficulties in providing a UHF link from the UK mainland to the Channel Islands.

Services available

Analogue radio

Digital television
Since 17 November 2010, Fremont Point broadcasts digital television only, replacing the old analogue services. Only 3 of the 6 digital multiplexes are available from this transmitter.

Analogue television
Analogue television was broadcast from the transmitter from September 1962 until 01:30 GMT on 17 November 2010.

Relays

Digital television

References

External links
Entry at the Transmission Gallery

Fremont Point Transmitter at thebigtower.com
 Drawings of Fremont Point TV Tower - SkyscraperPage.com

Communications in Jersey
Transmitter sites in the United Kingdom
Towers in the Channel Islands
Saint John, Jersey